Table tennis at the 2021 Islamic Solidarity Games  was held in Konya, Turkey from 7 to 11 August 2022 in TÜYAP Konya International Fair Center. Seeded players were based on ITTF 2021 Individual World Ranking and were approved by the Technical Delegates. 
Table Tennis Individual Competitions were held according to the elimination format, over 7 sets. All matches in Table Tennis Team categories were played over 5 sets. Para table tennis competitions were organized in KTO TUYAP Konya International Fair Center between 13–15 August 2022.

The Games were originally scheduled to take place from 20 to 29 August 2021 in Konya, Turkey. In May 2020, the Islamic Solidarity Sports Federation (ISSF), who are responsible for the direction and control of the Islamic Solidarity Games, postponed the games as the 2020 Summer Olympics were postponed to July and August 2021, due to the global COVID-19 pandemic.

Medalists

Medal table

Para table tennis

Medalists

Medal table

Participating nations

Table tennis
110 athletes from 25 countries participated:

Para table tennis
A total of 28 athletes from 9 nations competed in para table tennis at the 2021 Islamic Solidarity Games:

References

External links 
Official website

2021 Islamic Solidarity Games
2021
Islamic Solidarity Games